The Sampit conflict or Sampit war was an outbreak of inter-ethnic violence in Indonesia, beginning in February 2001 and lasting through the year. The conflict started in the town of Sampit, Central Kalimantan, and spread throughout the province, including the capital Palangkaraya. The conflict took place between the indigenous Dayak people and the migrant Madurese people from the island of Madura off Java.

Violence first broke out on February 18, 2001, when two Madurese were attacked by a number of Dayak in Sampit. The conflict resulted in more than 500 deaths, with over 100,000 Madurese displaced from their homes. Hundreds of Madurese were also found to be decapitated by the Dayak.

Background
The 2001 Sampit conflict was not an isolated incident, as there had been previous incidents of violence between the Dayak and the Madurese. The last major conflict occurred between December 1996 and January 1997, and resulted in more than 600 deaths. The Madurese first arrived in Borneo in 1930 under the transmigration program initiated by the Dutch colonial administration, and continued by the Indonesian government. In 1999, Malays and Dayak in Kalimantan joined forces to persecute and massacre Madurese during the Sambas conflict. Madurese were mutilated and raped, and 3,000 were killed in the massacres, with the Indonesian government doing little to stop the violence.

In 2000, transmigrants made up 21 percent of the population in Central Kalimantan. The Dayak came into competition with the highly visible and industrious Madurese, and in places like Sampit the Madurese quickly dominated low-level sectors of the economy, which negatively affected Dayak employment prospects. Additionally, new laws had allowed the Madurese to assume control of many commercial industries in the province, such as logging, mining, and plantations.

There are a number of stories purportedly describing the incident that sparked the violence in 2001. One version claims that it was caused by an arson attack on a Dayak house. Rumors spread that the fire was caused by Madurese, and later a group of Dayak began burning houses in a Madurese neighborhood.

Professor Usop of the Dayak People's Association claims that the massacres by the Dayak were in self-defense, after the Dayak were attacked. It was claimed that a Dayak was tortured and killed by a gang of Madurese following a gambling dispute in the nearby village of Kerengpangi on December 17, 2000.

Another version claims that the conflict started in a brawl between students of different races at the same school.

Decapitations of Madurese
At least 300 Madurese were decapitated by the Dayak during the conflict.  The Dayak have a long history in the ritual practice of headhunting, though the practice was thought to have gradually died out in the early 20th century as it was discouraged by the Dutch colonial rulers.

Response by authorities
The scale of the massacre and intensity of the aggression made it difficult for the military and the police to control the situation in Central Kalimantan. Reinforcements were sent in to help existing military personnel in the province. By February 18, the Dayak assumed control over Sampit.

Police arrested a local official believed to have been one of the masterminds behind the attacks. The masterminds are suspected of paying six men to provoke the riot in Sampit. The police also arrested a number of Dayak rioters following the initial murder spree.

A few days later, on February 21, thousands of Dayak surrounded a police station in Palangkaraya demanding the release of Dayak detainees. The Indonesian police succumbed to this demand given that they were vastly outnumbered by the aggressive Dayak. By February 28, the Indonesian military had managed to clear the Dayak off the streets and restore order, but sporadic violence continued throughout the year.

See also
 Transmigration program
 Sambas conflict
 2010 Tarakan riot, a much smaller scale riot between Dayak Tidung and Bugis people in Tarakan
 Fall of Suharto

References

2001 in Indonesia
2001 riots
2001 murders in Indonesia
21st-century mass murder in Indonesia
History of Central Kalimantan
Conflicts in 2001
Ethnic conflicts in Indonesia
Ethnic riots
Headhunting
Riots and civil disorder in Indonesia